The Queanbeyan railway bridges over Queanbeyan and Molonglo Rivers are two heritage-listed railway bridges that carry the Bombala railway line in the Queanbeyan-Palerang Region local government area of New South Wales, Australia. Both bridges were built between 1926 and 1927. The two railway bridges are owned by RailCorp, an agency of the Government of New South Wales. Together, the two bridges were added to the New South Wales State Heritage Register on 2 April 1999.

History 

The bridges were first built by contractors Johnston & Co. in 1885-87 along with the extension of the railway from Bungendore to Michelago through Queanbeyan. The Molonglo River bridge was completed in May 1886 and the Queanbeyan River bridge in July 1887, both opening with the line in September 1887. The original bridges consisted of arched hardwood timber girders on brick piers and stone abutments, featuring four spans (Molonglo River) and five spans (Queanbeyan River) of  each. The stone for the abutments came from the quarries at Pyrmont in Sydney. A temporary bridge over the Queanbeyan River during construction was reported at the time to be the largest temporary railway bridge ever constructed in New South Wales.

The bridges were completely rebuilt in 1926–27 at a cost of A£19,000, re-using the foundations of the original bridge. Both bridges were of the Warren deck steel truss type, consisting of four  steel spans on the approaches to each side with three (Queanbeyan River) and two (Molonglo River) spans of  comprising the main bridge. The timbers of the original bridge were still in "a remarkable state of preservation" when replaced, such that it could not be cut in some cases. The bridge upgrade allowed a heavier type of engine to be run on the line.

The Molonglo River bridge is sometimes known as the Burbong bridge, Burbong being a historical name for its location.

Heritage listing 

The Queanbeyan rail bridges over Queanbeyan and Burbong Rivers was listed on the New South Wales State Heritage Register on 2 April 1999 having satisfied the following criteria.

The place possesses uncommon, rare or endangered aspects of the cultural or natural history of New South Wales.

This item has some historical rarity due its association with the 1887 Cooma Railway and the reuse of the original foundations for the 1926 replacement trusses. The Warren deck trusses are relatively rare because there are only four other railway sites in NSW with this type of superstructure.

See also 

List of railway bridges in New South Wales

References

Attribution

External links 
 
 
 

New South Wales State Heritage Register
Queanbeyan
Railway bridges in New South Wales
Articles incorporating text from the New South Wales State Heritage Register
1926 establishments in Australia
Bridges completed in 1926
Warren truss bridges
Truss bridges in Australia
Steel bridges in Australia
Bombala railway line